Boris Sergeyevich Brunov (10 June 1922, Tiflis – 2 September 1997, Moscow) was a Soviet and Russian actor and entertainer. In 1985, he was named a People's Artist of the RSFSR. He was a director of the Moscow State Variety Theatre.

References

External links

1922 births
1997 deaths
20th-century Russian male actors
Actors from Tbilisi
Honored Artists of the RSFSR
People's Artists of the RSFSR
Recipients of the Order of the Red Banner of Labour
Russian directors
Russian male actors
Soviet directors
Soviet male actors
Russian drama teachers
Soviet drama teachers
Burials at Novodevichy Cemetery